Leptodesmus thwaitesii, is a species of millipedes in the family Chelodesmidae. It was once thought endemic to Sri Lanka, where first documented from Peradeniya.

References

Polydesmida
Millipedes of Asia
Animals described in 1865